was a mid-Heian waka and Japanese nobleman.

He was the son of Fujiwara no Tokihira.

Poetry 
Many of Atsutada's poems written in correspondence with court women remain, and some are included in official poetry anthologies such as Gosen Wakashū.

One of his poems is included in the famous anthology Hyakunin Isshu:

External links 
E-text of his poems in Japanese

References 

906 births
943 deaths
Japanese male poets
Fujiwara clan
10th-century Japanese poets
Hyakunin Isshu poets